Ekta Jain is an Indian television and Film actress known for portraying  Shagun, Shaka Laka Boom Boom, Family No.1 and Apun Toh Bas Vaise Hi. She has earlier worked in films like Anjaane , Nayak: The Real Hero.

Filmography

Television

References

External links

Actresses in Hindi cinema
Year of birth missing (living people)
Living people